Hellsing (stylized in all caps) is a Japanese manga series written and illustrated by Kouta Hirano. It was serialized in Shōnen Gahōsha's seinen manga magazine Young King OURs from May 1997 to September 2008, with its chapters collected in ten tankōbon volumes. The series chronicles the efforts of the mysterious and secret Hellsing Organization as it combats vampires, ghouls, and other supernatural foes who threaten England. The series was licensed for English language release in North America by Dark Horse Comics. From 2002 to 2006, Hirano released a six-chapter prequel series, Hellsing: The Dawn, in Young King OURs Zōkan (later Young King OURs+ before ceasing publication).

A thirteen-episode anime television series adaptation by Gonzo, directed by Umanosuke Iida and Yasunori Urata, with screenplay by Chiaki J. Konaka, was broadcast on Fuji TV from October 2001 to January 2002. A ten-episode original video animation (OVA), titled Hellsing Ultimate, was produced by Geneon. It followed the manga storyline more closely than the anime series. It was released between February 2006 and December 2012. In North America, both the TV series and the OVA were first licensed by Geneon Entertainment and later by Funimation.

Plot

Hellsing is named after and centered around the Royal Order of Protestant Knights originally led by Abraham Van Helsing. The mission of Hellsing is to search for and destroy the undead and other supernatural forces of evil that threaten the queen and the country. This organization is currently led by Sir Integra Fairbrook Wingates Hellsing, who inherited the leadership of Hellsing as a child after the death of her father. She witnessed his death which turned her from a once innocent and shy little girl to a tough and deadly force.  She is protected by the faithful Hellsing family butler Walter C. Dornez, a deadly foe in his own right, and Alucard, the original and most powerful vampire, who swore loyalty to the Hellsing family after being defeated by Van Helsing one hundred years before the story takes place. These formidable guardians are joined early on in the storyline by former police officer Seras Victoria, whom Alucard turned into a vampire.

As the scale and frequency of incidents involving the undead escalate in England and all around the world, Sir Integra discovers that the remnants of a Nazi group called Millennium still exist and are intent on reviving Nazi Germany by creating a battalion of vampires. Millennium, Hellsing, and the Vatican section XIII Iscariot clash in an apocalyptic three-sided war in London, and Millennium reveals its true objective: to destroy the vampire lord Alucard, ending a feud begun during World War II.

Production
In 1996, manga author Kouta Hirano published a one-shot, titled Hellsing: The Legends of Vampire Hunter, in Wanimagazine's hentai magazine Comic Kairakuten. Hirano commented that it was not his intention to create a story of this genre, and that he only wanted to create a "somewhat daring" action story. Hirano said that the original story did not take him long to create, and that the fact that he was drawing hentai at the time afforded him the opportunity to have it published. Afterwards, Hirano considered to create another story, using the same setting, removing the erotic side and focusing more on the action, explaining that this was the origin of Hellsing. Given its "atypical" universe, Hirano and the publisher, Shōnen Gahōsha, decided to test the reception with readers, explaining that that was the reason why the start of the series may seem "a little disjointed", and that after the reception turned out to be positive, it was decided to make it a serialized work.

Hirano stated that he wanted to make a story with gunplay, but that a story of vampires with guns would not work with Alucard being portrayed as a "formulaic vampire", so Hirano added him a hat and a long coat, stating: "[i]t's still dark and ominous, but just more suited to his behavior. I always come up with the characters before the story." Hirano said that he received various comments comparing Alucard's design to Vash the Stampede from Trigun (whose continuation, Trigun Maximum, was also published in Young King OURs), expressing that he "shouldn't have given him the sunglasses". Hirano said that, due to the "dark, desolate story", he wanted to create someone who made the series "a bit warmer" and a female character involved as well, so he created the character of Seras Victoria, who offered the opportunity "for both of those at the same time", adding that she is "the only one who stands out from the darkness." Hirano commented that for the references to historical characters, mythology, and pop culture featured in the series, he did not do specific research, stating that he is not "someone with a lot of culture", but "just an otaku", and that all the references came from what he had saw and read out of "otaku passion".

The anime producer, Yasuyuki Ueda, commented that for Hellsing Ultimate he wanted to make it as an original video animation (OVA) instead of a television series due to the time limit that implies the former, and since he was a fan of the series, he wanted to take more time to "get more out of my system from the manga", adding that the OVA allowed him to do much more than the TV series. He discussed it with writer Yōsuke Kuroda and he agreed to write the script. Ueda commented, at the time, that various series were using CG animation, which he said that was "very time-consuming", especially when incorporating it to traditional animation, but that since the project would be an OVA, they did have the "luxury" to work with it, and that he wanted to use it for the weaponry and bullets to make them look realistic.

Media

Manga

Written and illustrated by Kouta Hirano, Hellsing was serialized for eleven years in Shōnen Gahōsha's seinen manga magazine Young King OURs from May 1997 to September 2008. Its 89 individual chapters were collected by Shōnen Gahōsha in ten tankōbon volumes, released from September 24, 1998, to March 27, 2009.

In North America, the series was licensed for English release by Dark Horse Comics in 2003. The ten volumes were released from December 1, 2003, to May 19, 2010. In January 2020, Dark Horse Comics announced that they would re-release the series in a three-volume deluxe edition, with over 600 pages each. The volumes were released from July 15, 2020, to June 16, 2021.

Chuang Yi licensed the series in English in Singapore. Madman Entertainment released the series in Australia and New Zealand.

Crossfire
Crossfire is a three-chapter one-shot story, which was published in the defunct Hobby Japan's magazine . It follows Heinkel Wolfe and Yumie Takagi, a Catholic nun and an assassin who work for the Iscariot organization. They call themselves "earthly agents of divine punishment". Crossfire also has cameos by Alexander Anderson and Enrico Maxwell, the head of Iscariot. Across the three chapters, Heinkel and Yumie face a variety of opposition, including Islamic terrorists, communist revolutionaries, and finally, an obscure pagan cult. Crossfire as a side work was discontinued by Kouta Hirano, but it was republished in the first three volumes of Hellsing as an extra. Crossfire was adapted into a drama CD and included in Hellsing Ultimate OVA 6 and 7.

Hellsing: The Dawn
A prequel series, titled Hellsing: The Dawn, was published Young King OURs Zōkan (later Young King OURs+ before being discontinued), with six chapters released from the March 2002 to the March 2006 issues; the series remains incomplete. The Dawn features a fourteen-year-old Walter C. Dornez and Alucard, in the form of a young girl, attacking Millennium's base of operations in Nazi-controlled Poland in September 1944, during the Warsaw Uprising.

Anime

The manga was adapted into a thirteen-episode anime television series by Gonzo. The series was directed by Yasunori Urata, under the chief direction of Umanosuke Iida, and written by Chiaki J. Konaka. The series uses the same characters and settings, but narrates a different story from its source manga. It was broadcast on Fuji TV from October 11, 2001, to January 17, 2002.

In North America, the series was first licensed by Pioneer Entertainment (later Geneon USA). Four DVD sets were released between July 23, 2002, and January 21, 2003. The series was broadcast in the United States on Starz!'s Encore Action channel, as part of its Animidnight late night programming block, starting in October 2003. The series was later acquired by Funimation in 2010; they released the series on a complete DVD set on November 13, 2012.

In the United Kingdom, the series was first licensed by ADV Films, who released four DVDs from July 21, 2003, to January 19, 2004. The series was later licensed by Manga Entertainment and released on a four-disc box set on August 12, 2013. In Australia and New Zealand, the series was licensed by Madman Entertainment, who released four DVDs from November 13, 2002, and February 11, 2003.

Original video animation

In April 2005, it was announced that a new original video animation (OVA) adaptation, titled Hellsing Ultimate (still known simply as Hellsing in Japan), more faithful to the original manga than the TV series, would be released by Geneon Entertainment in Japan and North America. The first four episodes of the OVA were animated by Satelight, directed by Tomokazu Tokoro, and written by Yōsuke Kuroda; they were released from February 10, 2006, to February 22, 2008. The three following episodes (#5–7) were animated by Madhouse, directed by Hiroyuki Tanaka and written by Kuroda; they were released from November 21, 2008, to December 23, 2009. The three last episodes (#8–10) were animated by Graphinica, directed by Yasuhiro Matsumura (#8, 10) and Kenichi Suzuki (#9–10), and written by Kuroda; they were released from July 27, 2011, to December 26, 2012. Each limited edition of the last three episodes' home video release included an episode of Hellsing: The Dawn.

In North America, Geneon Entertainment released the first three episodes from December 5, 2006, to October 16, 2007. Geneon announced that they would stop self-distribution of its titles in 2007. The first two episodes were broadcast on Starz Edge's Animidnight programming block on February 12, 2008; episodes #3–4 were also announced to air, but the 4th episode was not ready with an English-language track at the time and they were not broadcast. In 2008, Funimation announced that they would distribute "select" Geneon titles, and re-released the first three episodes of Hellsing Ultimate on September 16 of the same year, along with the fourth episode on September 23. In 2010, Funimation announced that they had licensed the 5th through 7th episodes; in 2011, they announced that they had licensed the 8th episode as well. Funimation re-released the first four episodes on DVD/Blu-ray Disc sets on October 30, 2012, while episodes 5–8 were released on the same formats on November 13 of the same year. Episodes 9–10 were released on October 28, 2014. The series was broadcast on Adult Swim's Toonami programming block from September 13 to December 13, 2014. Funimation released all the episodes on a Blu-ray Disc set on June 4, 2019.

Soundtracks
The music of the Hellsing anime television series was composed by Yasushi Ishii. Two soundtrack CDs were released: Raid was released on November 22, 2001; and Ruins was released on February 22, 2002. In North America, both CDs were released on July 1 and September 2, 2003, respectively.

The music of Hellsing Ultimate was composed by Hayato Matsuo. An extra CD, titled Warsaw Recording Selection, was released with the limited edition of the fourth episode on February 22, 2008. The original, Black Dog, was released on March 21, 2008; An extra CD, titled Nazi CD, was released with the limited edition of the first Blu-ray box set on October 22, 2010. An extra CD, titled Somehow, Iscariote, was released with the limited edition of the second Blu-ray box set on April 1, 2015.

Live-action film
In March 2021, it was announced that Amazon Studios is developing a live-action film adaptation of Hellsing with scripts by Derek Kolstad. It will be produced by Kolstad, Automatik's Brian Kavanaugh-Jones and Fred Berger, Ranger 7 Films's Mike Callaghan and Reuben Liber, and Soluble Fish Productions' Jason Lust.

Reception
The ten volumes of the Hellsing manga have sold 4 million copies worldwide. In 2005, the sixth and seventh volumes ranked among Diamond Comics Distributors' list of the top 48 manga volumes sold in the United States for the year.  In November 2007, the ninth volume was among the top 10 volumes sold according to Japan's monthly sales rankings.

In a review of the first volume, Winnie Chow of Animerica commented that the English translation "works to enhance the locations and people of the story", and noted that the original manga contains more comedy elements than its anime adaptation. Chow said that the series' violence is "everywhere, which is only to be expected when one is in the occupation of undead extermination", and that the characters are "magnificent to behold in action when they get into a frenzy, from crushing heads beneath their boot heels to impaling an enemy with an untold number of blessed blades", ultimately stating that Hirano "does violence right". Reviewing the first volume, Publishers Weekly called the series "mostly a fun, violent romp", stating that the "rather awkward" religious sparring between the Catholic Church and Hellsing, are "goofy details" that give it "some charm and energy". They concluded: "Hirano's storytelling is easy to follow, as stylish close-ups of the "we're-groovy-and-we-know-it" characters explode into violent full-page illustrations of all-out mayhem." In a review of the first volume, Barb Lien-Cooper of Sequential Tart gave it a 7 out of 10, commending the series for its worldbuilding and pacing, but criticizing the "repetitive violence", stating: "[y]ou've seen one blown off head, you've seen 'em all." Reviewing the first volume, Justin Rich of AnimeOnDVD gave it a B− grade. Rich commented that the series is consistent with the action, and while he stated that the first volume does not have a "real sense of a continuing arc", "orders here are very enjoyable", and concluded: "[s]itting down and spending some time with the blasé Alucard makes me look forward to the next volume." Connie C. of Slightly Biased Manga, in her review of the first volume, said: "[i]t's got just the right amount of blood and violence, great art, and I like everything about this series", concluding: "[r]ead it if you're in to this sort of thing, I promise you'll love it if you're not offended."

Reviewing the fourth volume, Liann Cooper of Anime News Network (ANN) said that one its "greatest strengths" is the impeccable storytelling of Hirano, calling the story "dark and gory", but also "incredibly amusing". Cooper concluded: "[c]ombined with highly detailed artwork and near flawless character designs, every action-packed, blood-spewing battle to each eerie character expression completes one of the most well-rounded manga series I've had the pleasure of reading. This is one horrifically enticing vampire series that you can't afford to miss." Hilary Goldstein of IGN, in a review of the sixth volume, called it "the best vampire manga around", and that it "clamors forward with a seething wit and a frantic pace, and style that passes beyond gothic grace." Reviewing the first volume, Ryan Huston of Manga Life gave the first volume a C− grade. Huston wrote that the series "borrow heavily" from the stylistic elements of Blade, Castlevania, The Crow, and BloodRayne, also calling it "very contrived", stating that "there's nary of whiff of originality", and criticizing the "inconsistent" artwork. In a more positive review of the eighth volume, Lori Henderson of the same website gave it an A grade. Henderson wrote: "I generally don't read blood-spilling horror manga, but for Hellsing, I make an exception", stating that she was "instantly hooked" by the series, concluding: "Hellsing is a title that totally lives up to its hype. The art is fantastic, and the story strings you along just enough to keep you coming back for more." Also reviewing the eighth volume, Katherine Dacey of PopCultureShock gave it a B+ grade. Dacey said that the plot of the volume is "absurd", but that "Hirano's bold visuals, insane plot twists, and extended action sequences make for an entertaining read, even when the plot makes absolutely no sense at all."

Reviewing the tenth and final volume, Davey C. Jones of Active Anime commented that it "doesn't disappoint but it is always sad to see such a great series come to an end", also expressing that the series has a "unique style and an awesome, mind bending anti-hero in Alucard", concluding that it is "hard not to keep from wanting more." Reviewing the same volume, Connie C., writing for PopCultureShock, gave it a B grade. She commented that the series is "ridiculous, violent, over-the-top, and absolutely revels in its debauchery", and called the epilogue "a little underwhelming", but stated, however, concludedt: "[i]t was violent and action-packed in the most extreme way possible all the way through and quiet moments feel out of place. It revels in depravity and does it better and marginally more coherently than most other series that try it. It's a true legend to the end." Carl Kimlinger of ANN gave the final volume a B grade. Kimlinger criticized its ending, stating that the final arc "finishes it in an undignified rush", and that it "falls back on some insultingly overused anime cheese to expedite its finish." Kimlinger, however, wrote that "a tired, rushed Hellsing is still Hellsing", adding that "[t]here's still enough demented ultraviolence and bizarre indulgences on display to shame all but the most transgressive of other manga."

Courtney Kraft of Graphic Novel Reporter said that one of the series' appeal is that "every cast member is very one-dimensional, and yet each is unique, interesting, and memorable", not only commending the main cast, but also the rival organizations, stating that "[t]here's no shortage of interesting characters to love." Kraft said that the series is "dark and violent and disturbing", but that despite its graphic nature "it should not be passed up." Kraft said that Hirano's artwork is "so detailed and full of motion that it's sometimes impossible to tell exactly what's happening", commenting that to some readers it may be "fascinating" and to others "just frustrating". Kraft concluded that reading the series is a "risk" and that people "either love it or hate it", but that "for those who love it, it can easily turn into an obsession." Reviewing the first volume of the deluxe edition, Danica Davidson of Otaku USA, commenting about its portrayal of Nazis as "monsters of the night", stated that the series "would probably work more in its absurdity if it stuck with fictional creatures." Davidson said that it is "an action-packed series with lots of bloody, gory battle scenes", and that the new edition "enlarges the pages so you can really appreciate the detail of the art", adding that Hirano's panels are "just fantastic at building a scene."

In Manga: The Complete Guide, author Jason Thompson gave the series 3 out of four stars, stating: "[a]lthough the story is technically sex-free, the phrase 'pornography of violence' doesn't begin to describe the fang-in-neck and gun-in-mouth action. lovingly drawn with gangly black silhouettes and rapacious, ghoulish faces", calling it as well a "masterpiece of fetishistic violence on a grand scale." Writing for ANN, Thompson called it one of his favorite manga. He commented that one of the fascinating things of the series is its willingness use religion and history as the motive for "this big fight-slash-slaughter", calling it "one of the most anti-religious comics ever" and "demented but completely sincere and original". Thompson concluded: "Hellsing is an epic ode to destruction and nihilism which happens to take the form of a vampire story [...] It may be confusing at times, it may go off the rails at times and go on a little too long, but it's a great manga with a lot of personal style and passion."

Notes

References

External links
 Official Geneon Entertainment Hellsing website 
 ANN Hellsing Ultimate 1-4 review
 ANN Hellsing Ultimate 5-8 review
 

Hellsing
1997 manga
2001 anime television series debuts
2002 manga
2006 anime OVAs
Action anime and manga
Comics about Nazi Germany
Comics based on Dracula
Dark Horse Comics titles
Dark fantasy anime and manga
Fiction set in 1999
Fuji TV original programming
Funimation
Geneon USA
Gonzo (company)
Graphinica
Madhouse (company)
Military anime and manga
NBCUniversal Entertainment Japan
Satelight
Seinen manga
Shōnen Gahōsha manga
Terrorism in fiction
Toonami
United Kingdom in fiction
Vampires in anime and manga
Works by Yōsuke Kuroda
Classical mythology in anime and manga